"I Still Burn" is a song by German recording artist Tobias Regner, the winner of the third season of the reality television talent show Deutschland sucht den Superstar, broadcast in 2006. It was written by Jess Cates and Peter Wright and produced by Brix Ingo Politz, and Bernd Wendlandt, marking the first time, a DSDS coronation song was not produced by judge Dieter Bohlen. Released as Regner's debut single on March 24, 2006 in German-speaking Europe, it became the biggest-selling single in two years to debut at the charts, where it reached number one in Austria, Germany, and Switzerland, making him the first DSDS winner to top the charts in all three regions. "I Still Burn" was eventually certified gold by the Bundesverband Musikindustrie (BVMI) and became Germany's 13th best-selling single of 2006. It was later included on Regner's debut album Straight (2006).

Formats and track listings

Credits and personnel
Credits taken from Straight liner notes.

 Arrangement – Rainer Oleak 
 Backing vocals – Mitch Kelly 
 Bass – Ingo York 
 Drums – Ingo Politz 
 Guitar – Uwe Hassbecker 
 Piano – Oliver Rivo 
 Producer – Bernd Wendlandt, Brix, Ingo Politz 
 Vocal coach – Jeff Cascaro 
 Writing – Jess Cates, Peter Wright

Charts

Weekly charts

Year-end charts

Certifications

References

2006 singles
2006 songs
Sony BMG singles
Deutschland sucht den Superstar
Songs written by Jess Cates
Number-one singles in Switzerland
Number-one singles in Austria
Number-one singles in Germany